Valangaiman Taluk is a taluk in Kumbakonam district of the Indian state of Tamil Nadu. The headquarters of the taluk is the town of Valangaiman. valangaiman taluk has 68 villages

Demographics
According to the 2011 census, the taluk of Valangaiman city  had a population of 100438 with 49,948  males and 50,490 females. There were 1011 women for every 1000 men. The taluk had a literacy rate of 72.07. Child population in the age group below 6 was 5,034 Males and 4,626 Females.

References

Taluks of Tiruvarur district